Molbergen is a municipality in the district of Cloppenburg, in Lower Saxony, Germany, approximately  west of Cloppenburg.

Notable people 
 1919-2009: Carlos Kloppenburg, German bishop in Brazil
 (born 1943), Manfred Carstens, German politician (CDU)

References

Cloppenburg (district)